Tantpur is a town in the Agra district of Uttar Pradesh state in India. It is 65 km from the main city Agra. The town is situated near the borderline of Rajasthan. There is a big mansion of  Late Thakur Shri Bihari Singh Parmar (RAEES) ;bestowed with title of "Raees" by the then British government. Tantpur is a large supplier of sandstone and it is also exported to all across India.

Famous

Tantpur is known for its mines of sandstone, which has been used in the Parliament of India, Ranthambore Fort, Gagron Fort, Kumbhalgarh Fort, Jaisalmer Fort, Amer Fort, Maheshwar Fort, Agra Fort, Bandhavgarh Fort, Garh Kundar Fort, Red Fort, Gohad Fort, Madan Mahal, Jabalpur, Raisen Fort, Sabalgarh Fort, Utila Fort and other Forts and Monuments of India.

References 

Cities and towns in Agra district